The 1983 UMass Minutemen football team represented the University of Massachusetts Amherst in the 1983 NCAA Division I-AA football season as a member of the Yankee Conference. The team was coached by Bob Pickett and played its home games at Alumni Stadium in Hadley, Massachusetts. The 1983 season was Pickett's last as coach of the Minutemen, who won four conference championships and appeared in the National Championship Game once during his tenure. UMass finished the season with a record of 3–8 overall and 2–3 in conference play.

Schedule

References

UMass
UMass Minutemen football seasons
UMass Minutemen football